ACH Volley is a Slovenian men's volleyball club based in Ljubljana that competes in the Slovenian League. They play their home matches at Tivoli Hall. The club was founded in 1970 and was based in Bled until 2011, when the team relocated to Ljubljana.

ACH have won the Slovenian championship a record 18 times, including 16 consecutive titles between 2005 and 2020. The club also won the CEV Top Teams Cup in 2007 and reached the final four of the CEV Champions League in 2010.

Honours

Domestic 
Slovenian League
Winners (18): 1999–2000, 2004–05, 2005–06, 2006–07, 2007–08, 2008–09, 2009–10, 2010–11, 2011–12, 2012–13, 2013–14, 2014–15, 2015–16, 2016–17, 2017–18, 2018–19, 2019–20, 2021–22
Slovenian Volleyball Cup
Winners (14): 2004–05, 2006–07, 2007–08, 2008–09, 2009–10, 2010–11, 2011–12, 2012–13, 2014–15, 2017–18, 2018–19, 2019–20, 2021–22, 2022–23

Regional 
MEVZA League
Winners (13): 2006–07, 2007–08, 2009–10, 2010–11, 2012–13, 2013–14, 2015–16, 2016–17, 2018–19, 2019–20, 2020–21, 2021–22, 2022–23

European 
 CEV Champions League
Final Four (1): 2009–10

CEV Top Teams Cup
Winners (1): 2006–07

References

External links

 

Slovenian volleyball clubs
Sports clubs in Ljubljana
Volleyball clubs established in 1970
1970 establishments in Yugoslavia